Kuinger is a village in South Sudan.

References

Populated places in South Sudan